Foremost is a village in Alberta, Canada.

Foremost has a strong agriculture industry. Recreation facilities include an ice arena, swimming pool, curling rink, ice fishing, and ball diamonds. Every June the residents hold a parade, rodeo and tough truck competition. Hockey is a big sport in Foremost. The local team is called the Foremost Flyers. They have multiple provincial and regional titles. The school has a long history of winning sports teams. The Foremost Falcons and Forettes have won many provincial titles in basketball, volleyball, track and field and cross country running. The village also has a strong arts community presenting community theatre as well as a school dramatic department.

Geography

Climate 
Foremost experiences a semi-arid climate (Köppen climate classification BSk).

Demographics 

In the 2016 Census of Population conducted by Statistics Canada, the Village of Foremost recorded a population of 541 living in 229 of its 257 total private dwellings, a  change from its 2011 population of 526.

Economy

Foremost Centre for Unmanned Systems
Foremost hosts the Foremost UAS (Unmanned Aircraft Systems) Test Range at the Foremost Aerodrome. Established by the Canadian Centre for Unmanned Vehicle Systems (CCUVS) in 2008, the Foremost Centre supports training for pilots in Beyond Visual Line of Sight (BVLOS) flights - the only one in Canada. The location was selected for reasons including number of sunny days, low population density, flat prairie terrain, low number of dwellings and minimal man-made obstructions. The site's range stretches across the County of 40 Mile, encompassing almost 700 square nautical miles and reaches up to 18,000 feet above sea level.

The site received Transport Canada's approval as Canada's "first permanent restricted airspace for Unmanned Air Systems (UAS, drone)" in November, 2016. Drone Delivery Canada began testing at the site in 2017 with the goal of commercially rolling out drone delivery in 2018.

The community, noted former mayor Ken Kultgen, expects the Centre "will be used by national and international businesses, universities and manufacturing companies."

See also 
 List of communities in Alberta
 List of villages in Alberta
 Foremost Formation
 Foremost Airport

References

External links 

1950 establishments in Alberta
County of Forty Mile No. 8
Villages in Alberta